Henry Covered Bridge may refer to:
Henry Covered Bridge (Ohio)
Henry Covered Bridge (Pennsylvania)
Henry Covered Bridge (Vermont)